Charles Herbert Woolery (born March 16, 1941) is an American game show host, talk show host, and musician. He has had long-running tenures hosting several game shows. Woolery was the original host of Wheel of Fortune (1975–1981), the original incarnation of Love Connection (1983–1994), Scrabble (1984–1990, and during a brief revival in 1993), Greed on Fox from 1999 to 2000, and Lingo on Game Show Network from 2002 to 2007. Woolery's musical career includes several advertising jingles, a top-40 pop hit with the psychedelic pop duo The Avant-Garde, and a number of country music releases.

Early life
Woolery was born in Ashland, Kentucky on March 16, 1941,

Career

U.S. Navy
After graduating from high school, he served two years in the United States Navy.  In 1963, Woolery worked as a wine consultant for Wasserstrom Wine and Import Company in Columbus, Ohio. He was also a sales representative for Pillsbury.

Music career
In the early 1960s, he sang and played the double bass with a folk song trio called The Bordermen. He also sang in a duo called The Avant-Garde who were in the psychedelic pop genre. The other half of the duo was Bubba Fowler. They signed to Columbia Records and had a Top 40 hit with "Naturally Stoned" in 1968, bringing the duo one-hit wonder status. During this time, he worked as a truck driver to supplement his income. They released three singles.

As a solo artist, he released five records with Columbia. After 1970, he signed with RCA and released "Forgive My Heart". In 1971, another single "Love Me, Love Me" failed to make any impact. He then turned to acting.

In the late 1970s, he returned to his singing career. Woolery charted on Hot Country Songs with "Painted Lady" and "The Greatest Love Affair". Between 1977 and 1980, Woolery recorded for Warner Bros. Records and Epic Records as a solo artist, with two low-charting singles on Hot Country Songs. Woolery also co-wrote "The Joys of Being a Woman" on Tammy Wynette's 1971 album We Sure Can Love Each Other.

Acting and television show host
As an actor, Woolery appeared with Stephen Boyd, Rosey Grier, and Cheryl Ladd in the mid-1970s film The Treasure of Jamaica Reef. He appeared as himself in the 1989 film Cold Feet that starred Keith Carradine and Rip Torn.

Woolery performed as Mr. Dingle on the children's television series New Zoo Revue in the early 1970s. During that time, he made his first game show appearance on an episode of Tattletales in 1974, alongside then-wife Jo Ann Pflug. Starting as a singer, Woolery appeared on an episode of Your Hit Parade. On January 6, 1975, he began hosting Wheel of Fortune at the suggestion of creator Merv Griffin, who had seen Woolery sing on The Tonight Show. Woolery hosted the show for six years. In 1981, he was involved in a salary dispute with the program's producers; he said in a 2007 interview that he demanded a raise from $65,000 a year to about $500,000 a year because the program was drawing a 44 share at the time, and other hosts were making that much. Griffin offered Woolery $400,000 a year, and NBC offered to pay the additional $100,000, but after Griffin threatened to move the program to CBS, NBC withdrew the offer. Woolery's contract was not renewed and his final episode aired on December 25, 1981. Pat Sajak replaced him.

Woolery hosted Love Connection (1983–1994), The Big Spin (1985), Scrabble (1984–1990, 1993), Home & Family (1996–1998, co-host), The Dating Game (1997–1999), Greed (1999–2000), TV Land Ultimate Fan Search (1999–2000) and Lingo (2002–2007). In addition, he was the subject of a short-lived reality television, Chuck Woolery: Naturally Stoned (originally titled Chuck Woolery: Behind the Lingo) in 2003. He also hosted his own talk show, The Chuck Woolery Show, which lasted for only a few months in 1991. He hosted The Price Is Right Live! at Harrah's Entertainment casinos, and appeared in the live stage show "$250,000 Game Show Spectacular" at the Westgate Las Vegas until April 2008.

Radio and podcast host
Since 2012, Woolery has hosted a nationally syndicated radio commentary show, Save Us, Chuck Woolery, which grew out of his YouTube videos. After two years as host, Woolery began a long-format podcast, Blunt Force Truth. With co-host Mark Young, Woolery expands on his conservative political ideals and current events, often inviting guest experts to join the conversation.

Political views
Woolery has spoken in favor of American conservatism. He is an active supporter of the Republican Party, and has mainly donated to Republican and conservative causes. He is a gun rights activist.

Woolery was accused of antisemitism after a series of tweets in May 2017, including this message: "Believe it or not. Karl Marx and Vladimir Lenin were both Jewish. I was shocked to find, most of the original Soviet Communists were Jewish." The claim that communism is Jewish in origin forms the core of the antisemitic canard called Judeo-Bolshevism. The tweet led to accusations of antisemitism against Woolery. In response to the criticism, Woolery tweeted: "Amazing to me, I point out that Marx and Lenin were Jewish, Fact [sic] of history, and now I'm being called anti-Semitic? why do people do this?"

On July 12, 2020, Woolery tweeted conspiracy theories that the Centers for Disease Control and Prevention, doctors, the media, and Democratic Party were lying about the COVID-19 pandemic. Then-president Donald Trump retweeted Woolery's claims. The following day, Woolery tweeted that his son had tested positive for the virus and that the "COVID-19 pandemic is real". His Twitter account was later made private before later being made again public.

Personal life
Woolery is a Christian who volunteers in ministry. He has been married four times and has at least five children. Woolery and his first wife, Margaret Hayes, had two children together, Katherine and Chad. Chad was killed in a motorcycle accident in January 1986. In 1972, he married actress Jo Ann Pflug and they divorced in 1980. They had a daughter together, Melissa. With third wife Teri Nelson, who is the adopted daughter of actor David Nelson and granddaughter of Ozzie and Harriet Nelson, he has two sons, Michael and Sean. In 2006, Woolery married Kim Barnes.

Filmography

Acting

Hosting

Discography

Singles

See also
 List of game show hosts

References

External links
 
 Chuck Woolery Signature Products website
 Political podcast co-hosted by Chuck Woolery

1941 births
Living people
American Christians
American conspiracy theorists
American country singer-songwriters
American game show hosts
American gun rights activists
American male singer-songwriters
American male television actors
American podcasters
American male pop singers
American rockabilly musicians
American television talk show hosts
Country musicians from Kentucky
Kentucky Republicans
Musicians from Appalachia
Musicians from Ashland, Kentucky
Paul G. Blazer High School alumni
People from Ashland, Kentucky
Singer-songwriters from Kentucky
Wheel of Fortune (franchise)